"(How Does It Feel to Be) on Top of the World" is a song by the British supergroup England United – formed by members of Echo and the Bunnymen, Ocean Colour Scene, Space and the Spice Girls. The song was written by Echo and the Bunnymen frontman Ian McCulloch and Johnny Marr and released as official theme of the England national football team for the 1998 World Cup. According to Official Charts Company the single has sold a total of 94,000 copies.

Background and release
In 1998, Universal Music Group and the UEFA European Championship called a group of artists to record the official theme of the England national football team for the 1998 World Cup. The supergroup, credited as England United, was formed by Ian McCulloch of Echo and the Bunnymen, who co-wrote the song with Johnny Marr, the Spice Girls, Tommy Scott of Space, and Simon Fowler of Ocean Colour Scene. The song was the final single by the Spice Girls released with Geri Halliwell's vocals, until the group's reunion in 2007. It was overshadowed however by "Three Lions 98" and "Vindaloo". It was released on 2 CD single formats on the same day, the first featuring the standard versions of the song, including an instrumental. The second featuring remixes by Perfecto and an alternative instrumental version. The sleeve designs were of the white home kit (CD1) and the away red kit (CD2).

Reception
Although the song was a substantial chart hit in the UK, peaking at #9, critical reception to the song was largely negative. Chris Evans was quoted as saying: "It is a good pop song, but you can't sing it on the terraces. You can't really get your teeth into the lyrics." Charlie Porter in The Times said that it was "a snivelling apology for an official song" that "washes over you". Matthew Wright, writing in The Daily Mirror quoted footballers Ian Wright and Rio Ferdinand describing it as "bollocks" and "rubbish" respectively. In 2006 Guardian readers voted it the second worst England football song ever, after 1982's "This Time (We'll Get It Right)". BBC reporter Mark Savage describes the song as "clumsy and boring". When it was played at Wembley Stadium, it was booed by fans.

Live performances
The song was first performed live on TFI Friday on 1 May 1998. On 21 May 1998, a performance of the song was recorded for Top of the Pops, which was broadcast on 5 June 1998.

Music video
An official music video was released featuring all the members of England United, with appearances by footballers of the National Team, including David Beckham, Ian Wright and Rio Ferdinand.

Track listing
CD one / Cassette
 "(How Does It Feel to Be) On Top of the World" – 4:50
 "(How Does It Feel to Be) On Top of the World (Instrumental)" – 4:47

CD two
 "(How Does It Feel To Be) On Top of the World (Perfecto Edit)"
 "(How Does It Feel To Be) On Top of the World (Perfecto Remix)" – 6:00
 "(How Does It Feel To Be) On Top of the World (Match of the Day Instrumental)"

CD (International)
 "(How Does It Feel to Be) On Top of the World (Radio Edit)" – 4:31
 "(How Does It Feel to Be) On Top of the World" – 4:50
 "(How Does It Feel to Be) On Top of the World (Instrumental)" – 4:47

Charts

References

England national football team songs
1998 singles
Songs written by Ian McCulloch (singer)
Songs written by Johnny Marr
Echo & the Bunnymen songs
Spice Girls songs
Space (English band) songs
Ocean Colour Scene songs
Football songs and chants
1998 songs
England at the 1998 FIFA World Cup